This is the complete list of restaurants in the Netherlands that ever have received a Michelin star.

1957–1970
The list below includes all restaurants with one or more Michelin stars awarded between 1957 and 1970:

1971–1980
The list below includes all restaurants with one or more Michelin stars awarded between 1971 and 1980:

1981–1990
The list below includes all restaurants with one or more Michelin stars awarded between 1981 and 1990:

1991–2000
The list below includes all restaurants with one or more Michelin stars awarded between 1991 and 2000:

2001–2010
The list below includes all restaurants with one or more Michelin stars awarded between 2001 and 2010:

2011–2020
The list below includes all restaurants with one or more Michelin stars awarded from 2011:

See also
List of Michelin 3-star restaurants
List of Michelin starred restaurants in Ireland
List of Michelin 3-star restaurants in the United Kingdom
Lists of restaurants

References

Lists of restaurants